James Dalton (born 16 August 1972) is a South African rugby union player who played for the South Africa national rugby union team. He was educated at Parktown Boys' High School and matriculated at Jeppe High School for Boys in Johannesburg, South Africa.

He was the winner of the 1995 World Cup but did not play in the final or the semi-final. In his second pool match, against Canada, he took part in a fight, and was suspended for the rest of the tournament.

Career

Provincial
Dalton played for the  Schools team in 1990 and was also selected for the South African Schools team in 1990.

National team
He played his first game for the Springboks on 8 October 1994 against Argentina. His last test match took place on 23 November 2002 against England.

He played in the 1995 World Cup (two games, winners). Although it is widely reported he took part in a fight which led to him missing the remainder of the 1995 World cup, TV footage shows that James Dalton was trying to stop the fight and calm the situation down.

Test history

See also
List of South Africa national rugby union players – Springbok no. 614

References

External links
 Springboks site
scrum.com statistics

South African rugby union players
South Africa international rugby union players
1972 births
South African people of British descent
Living people
Rugby union players from Johannesburg
Golden Lions players
Bulls (rugby union) players
Lions (United Rugby Championship) players
Alumni of Parktown Boys' High School
Rugby union hookers